The 1991–92 FIBA Women's European Champions Cup was the 34th edition of the competition. It was won by Popular Basquet Godella, today known as Ciudad Ros Casares Valencia, beating Dynamo Kyiv (representing the CIS following the breakup of the Soviet Union) in the final. Godella became the first Spanish team to win the competition.

Competition results

2nd Preliminary Round

|}

3rd Preliminary Round

|}

Semi-final Round

Final Four

Awards

References

Champions Cup
EuroLeague Women seasons